Arthur Ross Fielding (21 September 1880 – 1947) was an English footballer who played in the Football League for Nottingham Forest, Stoke and West Bromwich Albion.

Career
Fielding played for Hartshill before joining Stoke in 1901. He played twice for Stoke in 1901–02 before joining Nottingham Forest where he spent the 1902–03 season failing to establish himself in the side making 10 appearances. He re-joined Stoke in 1903–04 and established himself at outside right making 109 appearances for the "Potters". He left for West Bromwich Albion in 1908 after Stoke's relegation and later played for Burton United

Career statistics
Source:

References

English footballers
Nottingham Forest F.C. players
Stoke City F.C. players
West Bromwich Albion F.C. players
English Football League players
1880 births
1947 deaths
Burton United F.C. players
Association football wingers